Diatenes aglossoides is a moth of the family Erebidae first described by Achille Guenée in 1852. It is found in most of Australia.

The wingspan is about 40 mm.

The larvae feed on Acacia species.

Gallery

References

Calpinae
Moths of Australia
Moths described in 1852